The New India Assurance Building is an art deco office building made of reinforced concrete and designed by Master, Sathe and Bhuta, with artistic designer N. G. Pansare. It was constructed in 1936 in Mumbai, India.

Architecture 
The building's art deco architectural style combines modern art deco features with  a modified classicism, evidenced in the strong vertical ribs of the façade that give the building a monumental appearance, making it seem larger than it is in reality. Included in the design was a modern forced air cooling system with centralised duct work. Projecting surfaces on the eastern and western sides protect windows from the sun. To deal with potential power failures, the windows were constructed to open and close.

Notes

External links

Art Deco architecture in India
Office buildings in Mumbai
Office buildings completed in 1936